Micael is a name.

Given name
Micael Babo (born 1993), Portuguese footballer
Micael Bindefeld (born 1959), Swedish event organizer
Micael Bydén (born 1964), Supreme Commander of the Swedish Armed Forces
Micael Dahlén (born 1973), Swedish economist
Micael Freire (born 1994), Portuguese footballer
Micael Galvâo (born 2003), Brazilian jiu-jitsu practitioner
Micael Isidoro (born 1982), Portuguese road cyclist
Micael Kiriakos Delaoglou aka Mikkey Dee (born 1963), Swedish musician
Micael Lundmark (born 1986), Swedish snowboarder
Micael Priest (1951-2018), American artist and raconteur
Micael dos Santos Silva (born 2000), Brazilian footballer
Micael Sequeira (born 1973), Portuguese football manager
Micael Silva (born 1993), Portuguese footballer

Surname
André Micael (born 1989), Portuguese footballer
Felipe Micael (born 2001), Brazilian footballer
Letekidan Micael (born 1997), Eritrean actress
Rúben Micael (born 1986), Portuguese footballer

See also
Michael